La Malquerida is the sixth album by the Mexican singer Mariana Seoane, launched in 2012.

Track listing
 Me Equivoqué
 Una de Dos
 Que No Me Faltes Tú
 Mermelada
 La Malquerida
 La Mañana
 Nadie Me Lo Contó
 Loca
 Atrévete a Mirarme de Frente
 No Vuelvo Contigo
 El Pueblo
 Tan Sólo Puedo Amarte

References

Mariana Seoane albums
2012 albums